Adolfus alleni, also known commonly as the alpine meadow lizard or the alpine-meadow lizard, is a species of lizard in the family Lacertidae. The species is endemic to Kenya.

Habitat and geographic range

Description

Reproduction
A. alleni is oviparous.

Etymology
The specific name, alleni, is in honor of American zoologist Glover Morrill Allen.

References

Further reading
Barbour T (1914). "Some New Reptiles". Proceedings of the New England Zoological Club 4: 95-98. (Algiroides alleni, new species, pp. 97–98).
Spawls S, Howell K, Hinkel H, Menegon M (2018). Field Guide to East African Reptiles, Second Edition. London: Bloomsbury Natural History. 624 pp. . (Adolfus alleni, p. 182).
Wagner P, Greenbaum E, Malonza P, Branch B (2014). "Resolving sky island speciation in populations of East African Adolfus alleni (Sauria, Lacertidae)". Salamandra 50 (1): 1–17.

Adolfus
Lacertid lizards of Africa
Reptiles of Kenya
Endemic fauna of Kenya
Taxa named by Thomas Barbour
Reptiles described in 1914